Kanchana (also known as Muni 2: Kanchana) is a 2011 Indian Tamil-language horror comedy film written, produced and directed by Raghava Lawrence. It is a sequel to his previous venture, Muni (2007) and the second installment in the Muni (film series). The film stars Lawrence alongside Sarathkumar, Kovai Sarala and Lakshmi Rai while Devadarshini and Sriman play supporting roles.

The film revolves around Raghava, who is scared to venture outside gets possessed by a ghost and starts behaving weirdly. The film's cinematography and editing was handled by Vetri and Kishore Te, respectively. The film's soundtrack was composed by Sai Thaman. The film's distribution rights were bought by Sri Thenandal Films.The Central Board Of Film Certification (CBFC) gave the film an "A" Certificate for "Violence" and "Horror".

Kanchana's Tamil version was released on 22 July 2011 while a same-titled Telugu dubbed version was released a week earlier on 15 July 2011. Despite receiving mixed reviews from critics, the film became a commercial success in both languages. The film has been remade several times including – in Kannada as Kalpana, in Sinhala  Sri Lanka as Maya, in Bengali Bangladesh as Mayabini, and in Hindi as Laxmii; Lawrence acted as screenwriter on Kalpana, while directing and co-writing Laxmii.

Plot
Raghava, an unemployed youth has developed an irrational phasmophobia and refuses to step out of his house after sunset, still chooses to sleep in his mother's room and forces her accompany him to restroom at night. His antics disrupt the peace of his family constituting his widowed mother Sarala, elder brother Prasad, the latter's wife Kamakshi and their children. Raghava and his companions, who usually play cricket in a ground, are compelled to search for another as a construction activity is bound to take place in it and unwittingly choose an abandoned land, which is believed to be haunted by supernatural creatures. 

While they try setting up the cricket pitch, a peculiar weather change causes them to abandon the land and return home but Raghava doesn't notice that his cricket wickets have pierced corpses buried under the land and are stained with blood. Raghava woos Kamakshi's younger sister Priya, who has come to stay with them while Sarala and Kamakshi become panic-stricken by perpetual supernatural occurrences at their residence. Hiding it from their family, Sarala and Kamakshi consult a priest who suggests three rituals to test the presence of a spirit in their home. Raghava, Priya and the kids are sent to Kamakshi's maternal home for checking upon Kamakshi's ill-father, which is actually a lie told to prevent Raghava from obstructing the rituals. Sarala and Kamakshi's suspicions turn out to be true after they perform the rituals and to chase the ghost away, they hire two priests who ask them to stay out of the house while they try to captivate the ghost. However, they are actually con men who are chased away from the house but mislead Sarala and Kamakshi into believing that they have seized the ghost and are paid. Raghava, Priya and the kids return home the next day and the same night, Raghava gets possessed by the ghost. 

From the succeeding day, Raghava begins to act effeminate and detaches himself from Priya. While in a shopping complex with his mother and sister-in-law, Raghava continues to act unmanly, wears saree and women's jewellery embarrassing Sarala who slaps him. Raghava strangles a woman Madhavi to death and later disposes of her corpse unbeknownst to anyone. Kamakshi, that night witnesses Raghava wearing her bangles and eventually, exposes his womanish acts to Prasad and the family confronts him. Then, the family gets to know that Raghava is in fact, possessed by three spirits: a 'woman', an Urdu-speaking Muslim and an autistic man. Frightened, the family approaches a Muslim exorcsist, who drive the spirit away from Raghava's body and forces the woman's spirit to reveal who she is. 

The woman discloses herself to be a transgender woman Kanchana, who as a young boy named Karthik was disowned by his parents when they discovered his homosexuality. Karthik was later adopted by a Muslim Akbar Bhai, who had an autistic son. Regretting that she could not become a doctor due to her struggles, Kanchana slogged to have her adopted daughter Geetha, another transgender study. Geetha eventually secured a scholarship and was sent abroad for post-graduation while Kanchana bought a plot of land, intending to build a hospital there for the poor. However, the plot of land was unlawfully seized by an MLA Shankar for his love interest Madhavi. When Kanchana and Akbar Bhai confronted Shankar for his act, he brutally murdered them and compelled Akbar's autistic son to commit suicide. He then proceeded to bury the corpses in Kanchana's plot of land. 

Presently, the exorcist sympathizes with Kanchana but bound by his responsibility, captures her. Raghava, however realizes that Kanchana has been doing this for a good cause and allows her to possess him. Raghava/Kanchana fights Shankar and his henchmen but Shankar seeks refugee in a Narasimha temple into which spirits cannot enter. Kanchana prays to the god to let her enter his temple so that she could kill Shankar for justice to win. She gets to enter the temple and kills Shankar the way Narasimha had killed Hiranyakashipu. 

A few years later, Raghava, Priya and the family participate in the inauguration ceremony of the hospital built in the plot of land as per Kanchana's wishes. A few local goons come to threaten them for money for Kanchana possesses Raghava indicating that she will return when help is needed.

Cast
 Raghava Lawrence as Raghava / Kanchana (Possessed by R. Sarathkumar)
 R. Sarathkumar as Karthik alias "Kanchana"
 Aryan Preet as young Karthik alias Kanchana
 Kovai Sarala as Sarala - Raghava's mother
 Lakshmi Rai as Priya -  Raghava's girlfriend (Kamakshi's Younger sister)
 Devadarshini as Kamakshi - Raghava's sister-in-law and Priya's elder sister
 Sriman as Prasad - Raghava's elder brother and Kamakshi's husband
 Devan as MLA Shankar [Main Antagonist]
 Babu Antony as Akbar Bhai
 Priya as Krishnan alias "Geetha"
 Sarvesh Rao as young Geetha
 Manobala as fake priest 1 
 Mayilsamy as fake priest 2
 Minnal Deepa as Madhavi - Shankar's girlfriend
 Jasper as Shahnawaz Peer Baba
 Boys Rajan as School Head Master
 Munnar Ramesh as Manickam - Karthik's father

Soundtrack
The film's original soundtrack has been composed by S. Thaman.

Reception

Critical response
The film received mixed reviews from critics. Rediff wrote "It is torturous and tedious to watch, the chills and thrills are not spine-chilling and a soundtrack that is supposed to be eerie is anything but. There's quite a bit of unintended comedy too". Great Andhra wrote  "As for Lawrence, his intention was to target the mass audience and he has been fairly successful in his attempt as compared to his prequel by infusing good depth and emotional intensity". Sify wrote:"On the whole, Kanchana is an entertaining affair and can be watched once".

Box office
According to Sify, Kanchana emerged 2011's most successful Tamil film based on return on investment. The film grossed around   share from Tamil Nadu alone at the end of its run.

Accolades
Tamil Nadu State Film Awards
 Best Choreographer - Raghava Lawrence
Vijay Awards
 Best Supporting Actor - R. Sarathkumar
 Best Female Comedian - Kovai Sarala

1st South Indian International Movie Awards
 Best Actor in a Supporting Role - R. Sarathkumar

Sequel and remakes
In early 2012, sources claimed that Raghava Lawrence was planning to make a third part of Muni. Furthermore, it was suggested that Lawrence's brother might play the lead role in the sequel. Instead, he danced with his brother in a cameo for the film. Eventually the third installment Kanchana 2 was released on 17 April 2015 and fourth installment Kanchana 3 was released on 19 April 2019 both were commercial success at the box office.

Rama Narayanan, who distributed the Tamil version directed the Kannada remake of the film titled Kalpana with Upendra playing lead role and Sai Kumar playing the transgender role and Lakshmi Rai reprising her role from the original film. It was released in September 2012.

In the 2016 Sri Lankan remake, Maya, directed by Donald Jayantha, Ranjan Ramanayake played the role initially portrayed by Sarath Kumar as Kanchana. It was unofficially remade as Tar Tay Gyi (2017) in Myanmar. In 2017, the Bangladeshi remake of the film released titled Mayabini starring Symon Sadik and Airin Sultana.

Lawrence himself directed the Hindi remake titled Laxmii starring Akshay Kumar and Kiara Advani. It released on the online streaming service Disney+ Hotstar on 9 November 2020.

Legacy
The song "Sangili Bungili Kadhava Thora" inspired a 2017 film of same name starring Jiiva which was also based on the genre of horror-comedy.

See also
List of Indian horror films
List of ghost films

References

External links
 
 Kanchana: Muni 2 on 

2011 films
Films about trans women
Indian sequel films
Indian comedy horror films
LGBT-related comedy horror films
Tamil films remade in other languages
Indian films about revenge
2010s Tamil-language films
Films scored by Thaman S
2011 comedy horror films
2011 masala films
Indian LGBT-related films
2011 LGBT-related films